The Tuneros de San Luis Potosí were a Minor league baseball club which played during 16 seasons spanning 1946–2006. The Tuneros were based in the city of San Luis Potosí, in the Mexican state of San Luis Potosí.

The first Tuneros team played from 1946 through 1952 in the Mexican League. After 13 years of absence, another club with a similar name played in the Mexican Central League from 1960–1962 and once more in 1971. Then, they joined the expanded Mexican League from 1986–1990; played as the Reales de San Luis Potosí in 1991, and again as the Tuneros from 2004–2006.

The Tuneros enjoyed their only winning season in 1971, when they won the MCL Central Division title with a 45–27 record but lost the final Series. After that, no team from San Luis Potosí has ever won a title in Mexican baseball.

Notable players
 
Sharnol Adriana (2005–2006)
Francisco Alcaraz (1950)
Shane Andrews (2004) 
Mario Arencibia (1950)
Darryl Brinkley (2005–2006) 
Paul Calvert (1947) 
Avelino Canizares (1947–1948)
Alberto Castillo (2004–2005) 
Juan Cerros (2005)
Jorge Comellas (1946)
Tommy de la Cruz (1947)
Martin Dihigo (1947)
David Doster (2005)
Leon Durham (1991)
Héctor Espino (1960–1961)
Bobby Estalella (1946–1947)
Pedro Formental (1946)
Chico García (1946–1947; 1949)
Steve Gerkin (1949)
Roland Gladu (1947)
Chile Gómez (1949–1951)
Vince Gonzales (1951)
René González (1947; 1949; 1951)
Red Hayworth (1947)
Gil Heredia (1989)
Rudy Hernández (1971)
Bobby Herrera (1946)
Darren Holmes (1988)
Mike Kinnunen (1990)
Jack Lazorko (1990)
Brian Looney (2004)
Isidro Márquez (1986–1988)
Agapito Mayor (1948)
Gabe Molina (2005)
René Monteagudo (1947–1949)
Bobby Moore (1991)
Roy Partlow (1950)
Ramón Peña (1991)
Héctor Rodríguez (1949; 1951–1952)
Barney Serrell (1948)
Walter Silva (2004)
Luis Tiant, Sr. (1948)
Efraín Valdez (1986) 
Jeff Zaske (1988)

Notes
 In Spanish language, the term tunero (too-neh'-ro) refers to a prickly pear picker. 
 The legendary slugger Héctor Espino, considered by many as the greatest player in Mexican baseball history, started his professional career with the Tuneros in the 1960 Mexican Central League season.

Sources
 Johnson, Lloyd; Wolff, Miles (1993). Encyclopedia of Minor League Baseball. Baseball America. 
 Treto Cisneros, Pedro (2002). The Mexican League/La Liga Mexicana: Comprehensive Player Statistics, 1937-2001. McFarland & Company.

External links
 Baseball Reference – Mexican League (AAA) Encyclopedia and History
Baseball Reference – Mexican Center League (D) Encyclopedia and History
Baseball Reference – San Luis Potosi, Mexico. Minor League City Encyclopedia
Plano Informativo – Los primeros Reales de San Luis (Spanish)

Sport in San Luis Potosí City
1946 establishments in Mexico
2006 disestablishments in Mexico
Baseball teams in Mexico
Defunct minor league baseball teams
Baseball teams established in 1946
Sports clubs disestablished in 2006
Defunct Mexican League teams
Defunct baseball teams in Mexico